Fabrice Awong (born 14 February 1991) is a former professional footballer who played as a winger or forward. Born in France, he represented the French Guiana national team internationally, making three appearances. Besides France, he has played in Greece and Spain.

Career

In 2011, Awong signed for Spanish sixth division tier Club Lemos. In 2013, he signed for Kallithea in the Greek second tier, where he made 17 appearances and scored 1 goal. On 15 September 2013, Awong debuted for Kallithea during a 1–0 win over AO Glyfada. on 9 March 2014, he scored his first goal for Kallithea during a 5–0 win over AO Glyfada. In 2015, he signed for Iraklis Psachna.

References

External links
 Fabrice Awong at playmakerstats.com

1991 births
Living people
French people of French Guianan descent
French Guianan footballers
French footballers
Association football wingers
Association football forwards
French Guiana international footballers
Kallithea F.C. players
Iraklis Psachna F.C. players
French Guianan expatriate footballers
French expatriate footballers
French expatriate sportspeople in Spain
Expatriate footballers in Spain
French expatriate sportspeople in Greece
Expatriate footballers in Greece